The 2016 season was the Tennessee Titans franchise's 47th in the National Football League and their 57th overall. It also marked the franchise's 20th season in the state of Tennessee as well as the first full season under head coach Mike Mularkey, who served as the team's interim head coach for the last nine games of the 2015 season.

The Titans tripled their win total from 2015 and achieved their first winning season since 2011. However, the team missed the playoffs for the eighth consecutive season tying a record set between 1970–1977 — the Titans finished tied with the Houston Texans for the AFC South division title, but lost the tiebreaker because the Texans had a better division record (5-1) than the Titans (2-4) did.

Draft

Notes
 The Titans acquired an additional sixth-round selection in a trade that sent guard Andy Levitre and a future conditional selection to the Atlanta Falcons.
 The Titans traded a conditional seventh-round selection to the Cleveland Browns in exchange for running back Terrance West.

Staff

Final roster

Team captains
Marcus Mariota (QB)  
Delanie Walker (TE)
Jurrell Casey (DE)
Brian Orakpo (LB)
Wesley Woodyard (LB)
Daimion Stafford (ST)

Schedule

Preseason

Regular season

Note: Intra-division opponents are in bold text.

Game summaries

Week 1: vs. Minnesota Vikings

Week 2: at Detroit Lions

Week 3: vs. Oakland Raiders

Week 4: at Houston Texans

Week 5: at Miami Dolphins

Week 6: vs. Cleveland Browns

The Titans posted their first victory over their former AFC Central rival since 2011 and only their third win over the Browns since 2002 league realignment established the AFC South. Marcus Mariota threw three touchdowns but Cody Kessler kept the Browns in the hunt with two touchdown drives in the final three minutes.

Week 7: vs. Indianapolis Colts

Taylor Lewan caught his first career touchdown.

Week 8: vs. Jacksonville Jaguars

With the win, the Titans improved on their 3–13 season from the previous year.

Week 9: at San Diego Chargers

Week 10: vs. Green Bay Packers

The Titans defeated the Packers for the fourth time in six meetings since becoming a Tennessee NFL franchise. The Titans raced to a 21–0 lead in the first quarter and led 35–16 at halftime. Rookie Tajae Sharpe caught his first career touchdown.

Week 11: at Indianapolis Colts

Week 12: at Chicago Bears

The Titans posted their sixth win of the season as Marcus Mariota faced off against Matt Barkley, in his first NFL action since 2014; he opened scoring late in the first quarter on a seven-yard toss. Mariota answered with three straight touchdown drives, but Barkley answered a Titans lead of 27–7 with two straight touchdown drives and whipped to the Titans red zone in the final minute, but two incompletions ended the game.

Week 14: vs. Denver Broncos

The Titans posted only their second win (in six tries) over the Broncos since becoming a Tennessee NFL franchise. They led 13–0 but had to sweat out a Broncos rally; A.J. Derby's fumble was recovered by Daimion Stafford with 1:04 to go. The game became chippy when Harry Douglas cut block Chris Harris, Jr. in the second quarter; Aqib Talib attacked Douglas and a melee erupted on the Titans sideline.

The victory was the 425th in the franchise's history.

Week 15: at Kansas City Chiefs

The Titans edged the Chiefs on a 53-yard field goal on the final play by former Chiefs placekicker Ryan Succop; he missed a first attempt but the attempt was nullified when Chiefs coach Andy Reid called timeout.

Week 16: at Jacksonville Jaguars

Marcus Mariota's season ended when he suffered a broken right fibula in Tennessee's 38–17 loss to the Jaguars; the loss marked the eighth straight season in which neither team managed to sweep the other in the regular season. The loss—combined with Houston's subsequent win over Cincinnati—ended Tennessee's hopes for the playoffs.

Week 17: vs. Houston Texans

The win was the Titans' first against the Texans since 2013.

NOTE: With the win, the Titans posted 9 wins and a winning season for the first time since 2011.

Standings

Division

Conference

References

External links
 

Tennessee
Tennessee Titans seasons
Tennessee Titans